Sing One For the Cowboy is an album by the Sons of the San Joaquin, released in 2000. The band won the Western Heritage Award for the album's title track.

Critical reception
Country Standard Time wrote: "References to the 'Red Man' aside, the group serves up a tasty slice of the Gene Autry-esque West: no bloody gunfights, no syphilitic hookers, just a longing for the trail and a longing to go home and lots of good harmonizing in between." The Gazette wrote that "these Sons offer a romanticized view of cowboy life wrapped up in tight harmonies and melodies that can be sweet on one song and exciting on the next."

Track listing

Personnel

Sons of the San Joaquin

Jack Hannah - vocals
Joe Hannah - vocals
Lon Hannah - vocals

Additional personnel

Rich O'Brien - lead and rhythm guitars
Mark Abbott - bass guitar
Richard Chon, Dale Morris - fiddles
Tim Alexander - accordion
Tom "Wolf" Morrell - steel guitar
Ray Appleton - harmonica
Bob Meyers - clarinet
Hereford Percy - banjo
The Remuda Ensemble
Vladimir Petrov - violin I
Lydia Svyatolvskaya - violin II
Tim Adian - viola
Dave Halvorsen - cello
Paul Nagem - flute
Guy Dutra-Silveira - oboe
Ramon Kireilis - clarinet
Michael Yopp - French horn
Dave Hanson - ensemble arrangements
Kathleen Fox Collins - ensemble producer

Production

Scott O'Malley - executive producer
Dane Scott - executive producer
Rich O'Brien - producer
Recorded at: 
The Warehouse Theater, Colorado Springs, CO
Butch Hause - engineer
ASC, Dallas, TX
Mark Petty - engineer
Mixed at:
Delgany Studios, Denver, CO
Butch Hause - mixer
Rich O'Brien - mixer
John Macy - mixer
Mastered at:
Capitol Mastering, Hollywood, CA
Robert Vosgien - mastering
Pete Papageorges - mastering
Cover photos by:
Marc Blake - photography
Donald Kallaus - photography
Booklet photos by:
Donald Kallaus - photography
Scott O'Malley - photography
Tray card photo by:
Anne Cline - photography
Scott O'Malley - cover concept
Joan Pelosi - cover and booklet layout
Scott O'Malley & Associates, LLC - artist representation

References

External links
Official site

2000 albums
Sons of the San Joaquin albums